The 1830 Maine gubernatorial election took place on September 13, 1830. Incumbent National Republican Governor Jonathan G. Hunton was defeated for re-election by Democratic candidate Samuel E. Smith in a re-match of the previous year's election.

Results

References

Gubernatorial
1830
Maine
September 1830 events